Pavel Nikolayevich Dovgal (born 22 December 1975 in Minsk) is a Belarusian former modern pentathlete who won a bronze medal at the 2000 Summer Olympics in Sydney, Australia.

External links
SportsReference.com

1975 births
Living people
Belarusian male modern pentathletes
Olympic modern pentathletes of Belarus
Modern pentathletes at the 2000 Summer Olympics
Olympic bronze medalists for Belarus
Olympic medalists in modern pentathlon
Sportspeople from Minsk
Medalists at the 2000 Summer Olympics